Karao (also spelled Karaw) is a language of northern Luzon, Philippines. It is spoken in the Karao, Ekip, and Bokod areas of western Benguet Province, and in the southwestern corner of Ifugao Province. The language is named after the barangay of Karaw in Bokod municipality, Benguet.

References

External links

Languages of Nueva Vizcaya
South–Central Cordilleran languages